Taos News is a weekly newspaper published in Taos, New Mexico. It is owned by El Crepusculo, Inc., named after the first newspaper published by Padre Martinez. The company is classified under newspaper publishing and printing manufacturers. It is estimated to have an annual revenue of $2.5 million and employs a staff of approximately 35. The Managing Editor of the paper is John Miller.

History
Padre Antonio José Martínez brought the first printing press west of the Mississippi River to Taos between 1834–1835 and published the first newspaper, El Crepusculo, which was the predecessor of The Taos News.

The Taos News has been published as Taos News and El Crepusculo de la Libertad. Archived newspapers are available from 1959 to the present day. The corporation was founded in 1978.

Purpose
The Taos News website states: "Our purpose is to report the news of Taos County and the Moreno Valley in a fair and objective manner consistent with the highest journalist standards. It is our intention to serve the citizens of Taos County by taking specific positions on important issues and allowing reasonable space to those with differing views."

Awards
The Taos News has won the following awards:

See also
 List of newspapers in New Mexico

References

External links
 

Newspapers published in New Mexico
New Mexican